Uzarzewo  is a village in the administrative district of Gmina Swarzędz, within Poznań County, Greater Poland Voivodeship, in west-central Poland.

The village has a population of 580. It is the site of a Museum of Natural Environment and Hunting, under the auspices of the National Museum of Agriculture in Szreniawa. It also has a church which lies on the Wooden Churches Trail around Puszcza Zielonka.

References

Uzarzewo